Long Lake is a lake in Thorhild County, in the Canadian province of Alberta, near Boyle, Alberta. The name of the lake is derived from the shape of the lake and has been used in the local area for many years.

Long Lake has been used for recreational purposes throughout the twentieth century, with the establishment of Long Lake Provincial Park occurring in 1957.

References

Long Lake
Thorhild County